Ada Ruth Habershon (1861-1918) was an English Christian hymnist, best known for her 1907 gospel song "Will the Circle Be Unbroken?" for which the tune was composed by Charles H. Gabriel.

Biography

Ada R. Habershon was born in Marylebone, England, on 8 January 1861.  Her father, Dr. Samuel Osborne Habershon, was a noted physician; her mother was Grace Habershon.  She was raised in Chelsea, London, in a Christian home.  In her twenties, she was a member of the circle surrounding Charles Spurgeon.  She met Dwight L. Moody and Ira D. Sankey in 1884 during their preaching tour of England.  At their urging, she visited the United States, delivering a series of lectures on the Old Testament that were later published.

Habershon's first foray into hymn writing came in 1899, when she wrote several hymns in the German language.  She wrote her first English language hymns in 1901, while ill. In 1905, Charles M. Alexander and R. A. Torrey toured the United Kingdom, and Alexander asked Habershon to write hymns for use during this evangelistic tour.  Habershon ultimately sent Alexander over 200 hymns.

Works

 Types in the Old Testament, 1898
 Vorbilder: Christus im alten Testament, 1899
 The Study of the Types (London: Morgan & Scott, 1898)
 The Study of the Parables (London: Nisbet, 1904)
 The Bible and the British Museum (London: Morgan & Scott, 1904)
 The Priests and Levites, a Type of the Church; a Bible Study, 1908
 A Sevenfold Method of Studying the Epistles to the Seven Churches, 1914
 Hidden Pictures: Or, How the New Testament is Concealed in the Old Testament (London: Flemming H. Revell Company, 1916)
 The Day of Atonement in Its Prophetic Aspect, 1916
 A Gatherer of Fresh Spoil; an Autobiography and Memoir, 1918
 I Am a Prayer and Other Poems, 1918
 Israel’s Exodus: Past and Future, 1918
 Outline Study of the Tabernacle
 The Victorian Handbook of Types
 Study of the Miracles
 The Titles of the Lord of Glory, 1910 (with a preface by Sir Robert Anderson)
  Exploring in New Testament Fields

See also
English women hymnwriters (18th to 19th-century)

 Eliza Sibbald Alderson
 Augusta Amherst Austen
 Sarah Bache
 Charlotte Alington Barnard
 Sarah Doudney
 Charlotte Elliott
 Katherine Hankey
 Frances Ridley Havergal
 Maria Grace Saffery
 Anne Steele
 Emily Taylor
 Emily H. Woodmansee

References / External Links

Profile from Public Domain Music
Biography at the Cyber Hymnal
List of Hymns from hymnary.org
 

1861 births
1918 deaths
Christian hymnwriters
English hymnwriters
19th-century English musicians
British women hymnwriters
19th-century British women musicians